Alphabet Soup  (March 31, 1991 – January 28, 2022) was an American Thoroughbred racehorse best known for setting a track record for 1¼ miles at Woodbine Racetrack when he won the 1996 Breeders' Cup Classic, defeating both the great Cigar and Preakness Stakes winner Louis Quatorze. Upon the death of A.P. Indy on February 21, 2020, Alphabet Soup became the oldest living winner of the Breeders' Cup Classic.

He was bred by Southeast Associates, a group led by Roy S. Lerman, and purchased by Californian Georgia B. Ridder. He was a descendant of Nearco, and his 
damsire was U.S. Racing Hall of Fame inductee Arts and Letters. Purchased privately as a two-year-old by Georgia B. Ridder, Alphabet Soup was late in developing. Mrs. Ridder raced the colt in California, where he began to come into his own at the age of four, winning the 1995 Native Diver and Del Mar Breeders' Cup Handicaps. In 1996, en route to his triumph in that year's Breeders' Cup Classic, he won three important graded stakes races: the San Antonio Handicap, the Pat O'Brien Handicap, and the San Pasqual Handicap, in which he defeated Best Pal. He also crossed the wire first in the Goodwood Breeders' Cup Handicap but was disqualified and set back to third.
 
Alphabet Soup raced in 1997 at age six, his best effort coming in defense of the San Antonio Handicap when he finished second to Gentlemen.

He was euthanized due to chronic kidney disease, at Old Friends Thoroughbred Retirement in Georgetown, Kentucky, on January 28, 2022, at the age of 30.

Stud career

Alphabet Soup retired to stud duty, he stood at Adena Springs in Midway, Kentucky.

Alphabet Soup descendants include:

c = colt, f = filly

References

External links
 Alphabet Soup's win in the 1996 Breeders Cup Classic
 Pedigree and partial racing stats
 Susan Orlean, "An Unlikely Champion Racehorse Who Charmed Everyone" — The New Yorker

1991 racehorse births
2022 racehorse deaths
Racehorses bred in Pennsylvania
Racehorses trained in the United States
Horse racing track record setters
Breeders' Cup Classic winners
Thoroughbred family 1-n
Old Friends Equine Retirement